Propaganda for Japanese-American internment is a form of propaganda created between 1941 and 1944 within the United States that focused on the relocation of Japanese Americans from the West Coast to internment camps during World War II. Several types of media were used to reach the American people such as motion pictures and newspaper articles. The significance of this propaganda was to project the relocation of Japanese Americans as matter of national security, although according to a federal commission created by President Jimmy Carter in 1980:

The promulgation of Executive Order 9066 was not justified by military necessity, and the decisions that followed from it – detention, ending detention and ending exclusion – were not driven by analysis of military conditions. The broad historical causes which shaped these decisions were race prejudice, war hysteria and a failure of political leadership.

History

After the Japanese attack on Pearl Harbor on December 7, 1941, American attitudes towards people of Japanese ancestry indicated a strong sense of racism. This sentiment became further intensified by the media of the time, which played upon issues of racism on the West Coast, the social fear of the Japanese people, and citizen-influenced farming conflicts with the Japanese people. This, along with the attitude of the leaders of the Western Defense Command and the lack of perseverance by the Justice Department to protect the civil rights of Japanese Americans led to the successful relocation of both native and foreign born Japanese.

On February 19, 1942, President Franklin D. Roosevelt issued Executive Order 9066, which recognized specific strategic sites on the United States West Coast as off-limits to people of Japanese descent. This order gave members of the military the authority to remove Japanese people from the area if their presence there was deemed too close to the strategic installations. In April 1942, Exclusion Order 346 was issued to force the Japanese American citizens to live in assembly centers which were located in various open spaces such as fairgrounds and tracks. By the fall of 1942, the Japanese people had been evacuated out of the West Coast and into inland internment camps built by the United States government to hold over 80,000 evacuees. Propaganda in favor of Japanese-American internment was produced by both the government and local citizens through mediums such as movies and print.

Films

As a common form of entertainment for many Americans, motion pictures portrayed a positive image of relocation to non-Japanese movie-goers. Produced by the United States War Relocation Authority, such movies as A Challenge to Democracy (1944) and Japanese Relocation (1943), depicted the internment camps in a positive light and showed the Japanese people as happy and content, benefiting from their new life in the internment camps. To accomplish this, these government-issued propaganda films touched on common positive themes, such as:

ensuring the safety of internee property
providing Japanese-Americans with greater opportunities, such as education, employment, internal government, and religion
cooperation of the internees with the local authorities and federal government
language comparing the relocated people to early American frontiersmen

Such motion pictures were made with film from actual Japanese American internment camps with a narrator informing the audience of what they were witnessing. As the UCLA Film and Television Archive writes:

[This] film reminds us how easily unpleasant truths can be rationalized into banality and individual liberties can be swept away. (UCLA, 2007)

Newspapers

As a prominent news source for many Americans in the 1940s, the newspaper media also played an integral role in influencing national attitudes toward Japanese American citizens. Many times, editorials published in these newspapers would approach relocation as a necessary inevitability characteristic in times of war. The San Francisco Chronicle on February 21, 1942, displayed just such an attitude of pro-Japanese-American internment, stating, "We have to be tough, even if civil rights do take a beating for a time". The Bakersfield Californian was among the newspapers of the time to criminalize the Japanese-American population, stating, "We have had enough experiences with Japs in times of peace to emphasize the opinion that they are not to be trusted." Violent sentiment would also be characteristic of some of these editorials, as when a writer to the Corvallis Gazette Times expressed, "The loyal Jap American citizens have the law on their side, but that may not protect them.  Besides, what is the law and what is the Constitution to a dead Jap.  If they are smart, they will not return". Many newspapers would also publish propaganda cartoons concerning the Japanese military, which fueled a general racist attitude towards Japanese-American residents.

A Newsweek column published in March 1942 presented arguments for and against the relocation of individuals of Japanese heritage. Those in favor of internment were paranoid of coastal submarine attacks near Los Angeles and Santa Barbara. Opponents expressed concern about undertaking a moral war overseas while simultaneously persecuting an ethnic group on U.S. soil.

Local newspapers from the Seattle area covered the internment in both a positive and negative light.

A weekly publication, the Seattle Argus, outlined several issues through editorial and opinion pieces. The newspaper took a pro-internment stance and in 1942 wrote, "If the innocent are interned with the guilty, it will not be a very serious matter. If any Japs are allowed to remain at large in this country, it might spell the greatest disaster in history" (Argus, February 14, 1942, p. 1).

The West Seattle Herald weekly newspaper came out as pro-evacuation of Japanese residing in the U.S. two months after the attack on Pearl Harbor. On February 26, 1942, the front page read, "Complete evacuation of aliens--a common sense move--why delay?" and "GET 'EM OUT!" on page 7 of the newspaper (West Seattle Herald, February 26, 1942, p. 7).

The Bainbridge Review, which was located on Bainbridge Island near Washington state, was the first place in which the U.S. military evacuated all civilians of Japanese descent. The Review became the only newspaper in this area to oppose internment in their editorials. It stressed that Japanese Americans were citizens and deserved to be trusted as being loyal to the U.S.

A weekly newspaper, the Japanese American Courier, employed Japanese-American writers hoping to ensure the country of the worthiness of their citizenship. This newspaper eventually was shut down as a result of the evacuations.

End of internment

On December 17, 1944, the United States Supreme Court deemed that exclusion of loyal Japanese-American citizens was unconstitutional and through Public Proclamation 21, the internment came to an end. It included the resettlement of the majority of the Japanese Americans and equal treatment of these people once back in their homes and neighborhoods. Those who were determined to be potential security risks by the criteria established by the Justice Department and War Department were not allowed into specific high risk areas. Though resettlement was issued by the U.S. government, anti-Japanese propaganda continued throughout the duration of the war until V-J Day on August 15, 1945.

See also
Japanese Relocation (1942 film)

References

American propaganda during World War II
History of racial segregation in the United States
Internment of Japanese Americans